Barberena is a surname. Notable people with the surname include:

Bryan Barberena (born 1989), American mixed martial artist
Marline Barberena (born 1987), Nicaraguan-American beauty pageant winner
Miguel Ángel Barberena Vega (1928–1999), Mexican Navy officer and politician